André Obey (8 May 1892 at Douai, France – 11 April 1975 at Montsoreau, near the river Loire) was a prominent French playwright during the inter-war years, and into the 1950s.

He began as a novelist and produced an autobiographical novel about his adolescence le Joueur de triangle (The Triangle Player). After his meeting with Jacques Copeau, he devoted himself completely to dramatic works. In 1945 Obey became provisional general administrator of the Comédie-Française. He was made full general administrator in 1946, and resigned in 1947 after just under a year's service.

Obey's play Le Viol de Lucrèce was drawn on by Ronald Duncan for the libretto of Benjamin Britten's opera The Rape of Lucretia.

Obey served as general administrator of the Comédie-Française, in a provisional capacity from October 1945 until 6 April 1946, then with full powers until his resignation on 5 February 1947.

Bibliography

Novels
Le joueur de triangle (The Triangle Player)/ 1928

Theatre

 La Souriante Madame Beudet (The Smiling Madame Beudet)/ 1921: Nouveau théâtre, premiere, April 1921. 1921: Broadway November 28, 1921 - December 1921
 Noé (Noah)/ 1931: Broadway February 13, 1935 - March 1935
 Le Viol de Lucrèce (The Rape of Lucretia)/ 1931: Broadway December 20, 1932 - January 1933
 La Bataille de la Marne (The Battle of the Marne)/ 1932
 La Carcasse (The Carcass)/ 1926
 Noah / 1935
 Lazare (Lazarus)/ 1950
 L'Orestie/ 1955
 Les trois coups de minuit/ 1957: English translation as Frost at Midnight by Warren Tute
 Revenu de l'étoile (Returned from the star)/ 1965

Reviews

References 

1892 births
1975 deaths
People from Douai
20th-century French dramatists and playwrights
Prix Renaudot winners
Administrators of the Comédie-Française
20th-century French novelists
French male novelists
20th-century French male writers